Daniel Nestor and Nenad Zimonjić were the defending champions and managed to defend their title, after winning 6–4, 4–6, [10–7] in the final against Simon Aspelin and Paul Hanley.

Seeds

Draw

Draw

External links
 2006 ABN AMRO World Tennis Tournament Main Doubles draw

2010 ABN AMRO World Tennis Tournament
ABN AMRO World Tennis Tournament - Doubles